Sangram Mukherjee (born 1981) is a retired Indian professional footballer. Born and raised in Kanchrapara, Mukherjee achieved fame during playing for Mohun Bagan AC. He last played for Southern Samity in the Calcutta Football League.

International career
Sangram has been capped at senior level for the India national football team.

Honours
East Bengal
IFA Shield: 2000, 2002

India U23
 LG Cup: 2002

References

External links
 Sangram Mukherjee - Player profile

Indian footballers
1981 births
Living people
India international footballers
India youth international footballers
I-League players
Footballers from Kolkata
East Bengal Club players
Salgaocar FC players
Mohun Bagan AC players
United SC players
Footballers at the 2002 Asian Games
Association football goalkeepers
Asian Games competitors for India
Calcutta Football League players